Domaine congéable was a type of contract between a landowner and the person exploiting it agriculturally, very common in Lower Brittany, above all in Cornouaille and Trégor. The landowner might be the following:

bailleur (landlord), qualified as owner of lands or woodland made up of noble trees (such as beech)
fermier (farmer), known as the domainier or colon, was the owner of buildings, ditches and embankments, as well as woodland made up of non-noble trees.

A bail or rental agreement was signed, to last nine years, on payment of a commission. The domainier (tenant) paid the foncier (owner) a fixed rent or convenancière each year at Michaelmas.

Real property law
Economic history of the Ancien Régime